Christian Vilhelm Balduin Grøthan (18 November 1890 – 6 April 1951) was a Danish football (soccer) player, who played 31 games and scored three goals for the Denmark national football team from 1915 to 1923. He also represented Denmark at the 1920 Summer Olympics football tournament. Born in Frederiksberg, Grøthan played as a defender for Copenhagen team B 93, with whom he won the 1916 Danish football championship.

References

External links
Danish national team profile
 Haslund profile

1890 births
1951 deaths
Danish men's footballers
Denmark international footballers
Boldklubben af 1893 players
Olympic footballers of Denmark
Footballers at the 1920 Summer Olympics
Sportspeople from Frederiksberg
Association football defenders